Aureimonas altamirensis is a Gram-negative, catalase- and oxidase-positive, non-motile bacteria from the genus Aurantimonas which was isolated from Altamira Cave in Cantabria in Spain. Aurantimonas altamirensis was reclassified to Aureimonas altamirensis.

References

External links
Type strain of Aureimonas altamirensis at BacDive -  the Bacterial Diversity Metadatabase

Hyphomicrobiales
Bacteria described in 2011